The 4th Stinkers Bad Movie Awards were released by the Hastings Bad Cinema Society in 1982 to honour the worst films the film industry had to offer in 1981. The ballot was later revisited and the expanded version was released in 2007, some time between the 2006 ballot and the closure of the site. Listed as follows are the original ballot's picks for Worst Picture and its dishonourable mentions, which are films that were considered for Worst Picture but ultimately failed to make the final ballot (29 total), and all nominees included in the expanded ballot. All winners are highlighted.

Original ballot

Worst Picture

Dishonourable Mentions 

 All Night Long (Universal)
 Beatlemania: The Movie (American Cinema Releasing)
 Blow Out (Filmways)
 The Cannonball Run (Fox)
 Chariots of Fire (Warner Bros.)
 Chu Chu and the Philly Flash (Fox)
 Clash of the Titans (United Artists)
 Comin' at Ya (Filmways)
 Condorman (Disney)
 The Devil and Max Devlin (Disney)
 Endless Love (Universal, PolyGram)
 Going Ape! (Paramount)
 Halloween II (Universal)
 The Hand (Orion, Warner Bros.)
 Hardly Working (Fox)
 Heavy Metal (Columbia)
 Honky Tonk Freeway (Universal)
 The Incredible Shrinking Woman (Universal)
 Legend of the Lone Ranger (Universal)
 Modern Problems (Fox)
 Mommie Dearest (Paramount)
 Neighbors (Columbia)
 On the Right Track (Fox)
 Paternity (Paramount)
 Porky's (Fox)
 Saturday the 14th (New World)
 Shock Treatment (Fox)
 Under The Rainbow (Warner Bros.)
 Zorro the Gay Blade (Fox)

Expanded ballot

References

Stinkers Bad Movie Awards